Senator Abrams may refer to:

Rosalie Silber Abrams (1916–2009), Maryland State State Senate
Steve Abrams (born 1949), Kansas State Senate
W. J. Abrams (1829–1900), Wisconsin State Senate
Winford Abrams (1868–1921), Wisconsin State Senate